Bay Hollow is a valley in Reynolds County in the U.S. state of Missouri.

Bay Hollow took its name from Bay Spring, which most likely has the name of the local Bay family.

References

Valleys of Reynolds County, Missouri
Valleys of Missouri